Klaus Müller may refer to:
 Klaus F. Müller (born 1949), German dentist and European pioneer of modern dental implantology
 Klaus J. Müller (1923–2010), German paleontologist